The Fortun Power Station  is a hydroelectric power station located in the municipality Luster in Vestland, Norway. The average annual production is 1,375 GWh.

See also

References 

Hydroelectric power stations in Norway
Buildings and structures in Vestland
Luster, Norway